Vuisternens may refer to:

Vuisternens-devant-Romont, canton of Fribourg, Switzerland
Vuisternens-en-Ogoz, canton of Fribourg, Switzerland